Sebastian Wolf may refer to:
 Sebastian Wolf (artist)
 Sebastian Wolf (footballer, born 1985), German footballer
 Sebastian Wolf (footballer, born 1993), German footballer

See also
 Sebastião Wolf
 Sébastien Wolfe